The 2012–13 Pune F.C. season is the club's 5th and 6th year of existence as well as its 4th season in I-League, the top-flight of Indian football.

Pune F.C. finished 2nd in the I-League, which is their best performance in the league.

After a good 2011–12 season in which the club finished 5th, Pune looked to bounce back to their 2009–10 form which saw them finish in 3rd place.

Overview

Pre-season

Transfers

The 2011–12 I-League season ended on 6 May 2012 for Pune but the business end of the 2012–13 season began three days later on 9 May with the announced departures of club captain and #1 goalkeeper for club and country Subrata Pal as well as central midfielder Baldeep Singh both to fellow I-League club Prayag United. It was then announced on 27 May 2012 that midfielder Paresh Shivalkar left the club and signed for newly formed Dodsal Football Club who would begin play in the Mumbai Football League.

Then on 5 June 2012 it was revealed that Pune top scorer for the last 2 seasons, Mandjou Keita, would be leaving the club to join reigning Malaysia Super League champions, Kelantan FA, on a free transfer. The Pune departures did not stop however as only three days later on 8 June 2012 it was officially announced that the 21-year-old defender, Rollingson Hungyo, would be one of the first official signings of the season for Shillong Lajong.

Then on 11 June 2012 it was officially announced that Pune had sold Indian international midfielder Lester Fernandez to Prayag United for 20 lakh in what is a notable event in Indian football history as this was the first ever transfer which involved money being given for a player instead of the usual free transfers.

Pune then made their first two signings of the season on 23 June 2012 with the signing of India international defender Nallappan Mohanraj and the even bigger signing of South Sudan international striker James Moga who scored 15 goals in the I-League in 2011–12 for Sporting Clube de Goa. Pune went on to make two more signings afterwards with the signings of Vellington Rocha and Mumtaz Akhtar from Margao FC and United Sikkim respectively. The club then signed the on-loan keeper from last season, Abhra Mondal, on a permanent deal from East Bengal on 11 July 2012.

The club then dipped into the 2012 I-League U20 championship winning academy squad by signing U20 captain Suji Kumar and Kamardeep Singh to professional contracts on 15 July 2012. The club then made their defense stronger on 30 July 2012 after they signed Zohmingliana Ralte from Shillong Lajong

Pre-season schedule and friendlies

Pune began pre-season training with the full squad on 16 July 2012. Seven of the players however began training with the club a week earlier due to injuries they had towards the end of last season. Those players were Amrinder Singh, John Benedick, Maninder Singh, Asim Hassan, Jeh Williamson, Kamardeep Singh, and Sukhwinder Singh. Two of the 26-member squad did not join the club till early August. They were midfielder Pierre Djidjia Douhou and South Sudan international James Moga. However defender Anas Edathodika, who is sidelined with malaria, is not decided how long he is out for.

For the first-week of training the club focused on non-ball exercises and fitness. The team was coached that week and supervised under fitness coaches Elton Menezes and Sridhar K. The second week still focused on fitness but added the ball as well for three sessions. On 3 August 2012 it was announced that the club would spend time in Goa in August and focus on technical and tactical aspects of the game and also play in a few friendlies.

The club played their first pre-season match against DSK Shivajians in Pune. Pune FC drew the match 2–2 with Singam Subhash Singh and Chika Wali scoring. The next game Pune took on the Pune F.C. Academy in which Pune FC won 2–1 with Subhash Singh scoring 2 goals. Pune and Subhash continued their good form against Deccan XI in which Pune won 3–0 with goals from Subhash (his fourth in pre-season), Jeh Williamson and an Asian trialist.

Players and Staff

First-team squad

Coaching Staff
12 May 2013

Transfers

In

Out

Academy Sign-ups

Appearances and goals

Competitions

Pre-Season and friendlies

Durand Cup

I-League

League table

Results summary

Position by round

References

Pune FC seasons
Pune